Ministry of Labour, Immigration and Population was a ministry which administered Myanmar's Labour affairs, Immigration affairs, Census and National Registration Card (NRC) system.

It was formed by combining of Ministry of Labour, Employment and Social Security and Ministry of Immigration and Population by President U Htin Kyaw on 30 March 2016.On 1 August 2021, following the military coup, SAC regrouped into two ministries, Ministry of Labour and Ministry of Immigration and Population.

Departments
Union Minister Office
Department of Immigration
Department of Population
 Department of Labour
 Social Security Board
 Factories and General Labour Laws Inspection Department
 Department of Labour Relations
Department of National Registration and Citizenship

See also
 Cabinet of Myanmar

References

External links
 Official website

LabourImmigrationandPopulation
Myanmar